Orly – Ouest is an Orlyval station in the northern part of the West Terminal of Orly Airport, near Hall 1.

Lines serving this station
 Orlyval

Adjacent stations
 Antony
 Orly - Sud

See also
 List of stations of the Paris RER
 List of stations of the Paris Métro

Ouest, Orly - Ouest (Orlyval)
Réseau Express Régional stations
Railway stations in France opened in 1991